Thomas Walker Luckey (January 6, 1940 – August 19, 2012) was an American architect and sculptor, best known for inventing abstract playgrounds called Luckey Climbers. Luckey also created furniture, merry-go-rounds, and interiors.

Life and career
After graduating from the Yale School of Architecture in the late 1960s, Luckey began remodeling friends' houses and doing experimental projects, including one described as transforming: 

In addition to interiors and furniture, he also designed merry-go-rounds; one, inspired by square dances, moves riders from one seat to another as they go around.

A mutual friend introduced Luckey to Agnes Gund, who insisted he contact the Boston Children's Museum. After he persuaded officials to let him build his first Luckey Climber, the structure turned out to be one of the museum's most popular exhibits, and has now been replaced with a new version.

Luckey died on August 19, 2012, at Yale–New Haven Hospital due to complications from pneumonia. He was 72.

Luckey Climbers
Luckey Climbers are multi-story climbing structures crossed with mazes and jungle gyms. In appearance, they have been compared to "a Calder mobile fashioned from Monet's lily pads". They have been installed in locations across North America that include:

No major injuries have occurred on Luckey Climbers, and they have a clean safety record—which is one of the reasons why they are so desired by children's museums.

Luckey (documentary)
In 2005, Luckey fell out of a second-story bathroom window and landed on his head. As a result of a fractured cervical vertebra, Luckey was paralyzed from the neck down. He continued to design Luckey Climbers, at first with the assistance of his son, Spencer; the one at the Delaware Children's Museum was his first to be fully accessible.

Filmmaker Laura Longsworth made a 2008 documentary, Luckey, about the personal and professional repercussions of the accident. The film appeared at a number of festivals, including SxSW and the Independent Film Festival of Boston, and garnered the Special Jury Award for Artistic Portrait at the Sidewalk Moving Picture Festival and Best Documentary Feature at the Indie Memphis Film Festival. The film has also been shown on the Sundance Channel.

References

External links
 
 
  (photo gallery)

1940 births
2012 deaths
20th-century American architects
20th-century American male artists
American architectural sculptors
American male sculptors
American people with disabilities
People from Quantico, Virginia
People with tetraplegia
Sculptors from Connecticut
Yale School of Architecture alumni